Jason Baumgartner, from the IBM Corporation, was named Fellow of the Institute of Electrical and Electronics Engineers (IEEE) in 2015 for contributions to formal hardware verification and its application''.

References

20th-century births
Living people
IBM employees
Fellow Members of the IEEE
Year of birth missing (living people)
Place of birth missing (living people)
American electrical engineers